The 2010 World Junior Hockey Championships (2010 WJHC), was the 34th edition of Ice Hockey World Junior Championship. The tournament was hosted by Saskatoon and Regina, Saskatchewan, Canada, from December 26, 2009, to January 5, 2010. Saskatoon had hosted the tournament once before, in 1991. The medal round, as well as all Canada's preliminary round games, took place in Saskatoon at the Credit Union Centre. The arena underwent renovations and upgrades before the 2010 tournament, including an increase in capacity. Other games were played at the Brandt Centre in Regina, which also received upgrades. In addition, pre-tournament exhibition games were held in other towns and cities throughout the province as well as Calgary, Alberta. In the gold medal match, the United States defeated the pre-tournament favourites and host country Canada 6–5 in overtime on a goal by John Carlson to win their second gold medal and first since 2004, ending Canada's bid for a record-breaking sixth consecutive gold medal.

Other host candidates
Initially, Switzerland was chosen to host the tournament, but later withdrew.

Three bid groups submitted letters of intent to host the 2010 tournament prior to the February 1, 2008, deadline:
Joint bid by Halifax, Nova Scotia, and Moncton, New Brunswick;
Joint bid by Saskatoon and Regina, Saskatchewan; and
Joint bid by Winnipeg and Brandon, Manitoba

All three bid groups formally placed their bids before the April 1, 2008, deadline and made their final presentations to the selection committee in Toronto on June 9–10, 2008.

On July 7, 2008, Hockey Canada and the Canadian Hockey League (CHL) announced Saskatoon and Regina have been chosen to host the tournament. This was Saskatchewan's first successful bid in five recent attempts, after failing to land the 1999, 2003, 2006 and 2009 tournaments.

Venues

Top division 

The lowest-ranked teams in the top division are relegated to Division I for the following year's tournament.

Rosters

Preliminary round 

Ten teams were divided into two groups of five, each of which play in a single round-robin format.  The winner of each group proceeded directly to the tournament semifinals, with the second- and third-place finishers advancing to the quarterfinals.  The remaining four teams participated in the relegation round to determine which teams will be relegated to Division I the following year.

Group A 

All times local (CST/UTC−6)

Group B 

All times local (CST/UTC−6)

Relegation round 
Results from any games that were played during the preliminary round were carried forward to the relegation round.

All times local (CST/UTC−6)

Final round 

* Decided in overtime.

Quarterfinals

Semifinals

5th place playoff

Bronze medal game

Gold medal game

Top 10 scorers

Top 10 goalscorers

Goaltending leaders 
(minimum 40% team's total ice time)

Tournament awards

Most Valuable Player
  Jordan Eberle

All-star team

Goaltender:  Benjamin Conz
Defencemen:  Alex Pietrangelo,  John Carlson
Forwards:  Jordan Eberle,  Derek Stepan,  Nino Niederreiter

IIHF best player awards

Goaltender:  Benjamin Conz
Defenceman:  Alex Pietrangelo
Forward:  Jordan Eberle

Final standings

IIHF broadcasting rights

Division I

The following teams took part in the Division I tournament. Group A played in Megève and Saint-Gervais, France, between December 14 and December 20, 2009. Group B played in Gdańsk, Poland, between December 14 and December 20, 2009:

Group A

Group B

Division II

Division III 

The tournament took place in Istanbul, Turkey, from January 4 to January 10, 2010.   and  have gained promotion to Division II for the 2011 IIHF World U20 Championship.

References

See also

 2010 World U-17 Hockey Challenge
 2010 Victoria Cup

 
Junior, World 2010
World Junior Ice Hockey Championships
Ice hockey competitions in Regina, Saskatchewan
Sports competitions in Saskatoon
International ice hockey competitions hosted by Canada
2010
World Junior Ice Hockey Championships
World Junior Ice Hockey Championships
World Junior Ice Hockey Championships
World Junior Ice Hockey Championships